Chalhuacocha (possibly from Quechua challwa fish, qucha lake, "fish lake") is a lake in Peru located in the Ancash Region, Huari Province, Huari District. Chalhuacocha lies near the Rurichinchay valley, northeast of the peak of Rurichinchay.

References 

Lakes of Peru
Lakes of Ancash Region